The Santa Rosa Transit Mall is a major transfer point for several bus routes serving the city of Santa Rosa, California, located in Sonoma County, north of San Francisco, in the United States. From the Transit Mall, passengers can travel throughout Santa Rosa and Sonoma County, plus destinations that connect the city with the rest of the San Francisco Bay Area and the Redwood Empire.

Description

Santa Rosa Transit Mall serves as a transit hub for two major bus companies serving Sonoma County:
 Santa Rosa CityBus - mainly serving within Santa Rosa's city limits
 Sonoma County Transit - serves Santa Rosa with several other communities in the county

Other agencies that serve the Transit Mall include:
 Golden Gate Transit - to Marin County and San Francisco
 Mendocino Transit Authority - to the Sonoma Coast and Mendocino County

Location
The Santa Rosa Transit Mall is located along Second Street (between B Street and Santa Rosa Avenue), configured as a set of bus stops within the city block. Its location being close to downtown and across from Santa Rosa Plaza allows passengers to work, shop, dine, and relax within the Transit Mall's vicinity. Its proximity also to US 101 and CA 12 allows commuters from Sonoma County and other locations to drive to the Transit Mall for commuter buses beyond Santa Rosa.

Agencies and routes serving the transit mall

Other major bus agencies, including Greyhound, which provides connections between Santa Rosa and the rest of the country, and Sonoma County Airport Express that provides connections between Santa Rosa and two Bay Area airports (SFO and OAK), do not stop at the Transit Mall; instead, these services stop at a hotel south of downtown. The city is also on the main route of the future Sonoma–Marin Area Rail Transit service, but, the railway station will not be built at the Transit Mall; instead, it will be built at Historic Downtown (Railroad Square), in which service from the Transit Mall is currently provided by Santa Rosa CityBus.

Features
Being the main transfer point in Santa Rosa, the transit mall offers two area platforms on either side of Second Street, being the North Platform and South Platform, which allows passengers to transfer between buses easily. A multi-story parking lot (park-and-ride) is available just next to the Transit Mall, allowing commuters and visitors to drive from Sonoma County and beyond to park and ride their commuter buses or shop at nearby downtown and Santa Rosa Plaza. Other features include:

 Disabled access throughout the Transit Mall
 Hotels, shops, banks, and services located at:
 Downtown
 Historic Downtown
 Santa Rosa Plaza
 Brickyard Shopping Center
 Close proximity to:
 Juilliard Park
 Luther Burbank Home and Gardens (at Santa Rosa Ave. & Charles)
 Santa Rosa City Hall (one block south)
 University of San Francisco (Santa Rosa Campus, three blocks north)

See also

 List of Golden Gate Transit routes
 Napa VINE

Notes

Transportation in Santa Rosa, California
Transportation buildings and structures in Sonoma County, California
Buildings and structures in Santa Rosa, California
Bus stations in the San Francisco Bay Area